Adrián Andrés Cubas (born 22 May 1996) is a professional footballer who plays as midfielder for MLS club Vancouver Whitecaps. Born in Argentina, he represents the Paraguay national team.

Club career
On 28 April 2022, he signed a contract with Major League Soccer side Vancouver Whitecaps until June 2026.

He was purchased for a reported fee of $3 million from French club Nîmes Olympique.

Personal life 
Cubas's father is from Paraguay.

Career statistics

Club

Honours
Boca Juniors
Primera División: 2015
Copa Argentina: 2014–15

Vancouver Whitecaps
 Canadian Championship: 2022

References

External links

1996 births
Sportspeople from Misiones Province
Argentine sportspeople of Paraguayan descent
Citizens of Paraguay through descent
Living people
Argentine footballers
Argentina under-20 international footballers
Paraguayan footballers
Paraguay international footballers
Association football midfielders
Argentine Primera División players
Serie A players
Ligue 1 players
Ligue 2 players
Boca Juniors footballers
Delfino Pescara 1936 players
Defensa y Justicia footballers
Talleres de Córdoba footballers
Nîmes Olympique players
Vancouver Whitecaps FC players
Argentine expatriate footballers
Paraguayan expatriate footballers
Argentine expatriate sportspeople in Italy
Paraguayan expatriate sportspeople in Italy
Expatriate footballers in Italy
Argentine expatriate sportspeople in France
Paraguayan expatriate sportspeople in France
Expatriate footballers in France
Argentine expatriate sportspeople in Canada
Paraguayan expatriate sportspeople in Canada
Expatriate soccer players in Canada
Major League Soccer players
Designated Players (MLS)